International Textiles (later The Ambassador) was a British export magazine for textiles and fashion. It was published in Amsterdam by Pallas Studio established by Ludwig Katz and a Haarlem publishing house De Spaarnestad.

Background
The half-Jewish Ludwig Katz, former Advertising Manager of L. Schottlaender & Co (publishers of the textile periodical Der Konfektionär), has fled with his family penniless to the Netherlands, after the periodical was "aryerized". Nevertheless, his wide business contacts facilitated his establishment of Pallas Studio and helped him to launch International Textiles on 15 December 1933.

László Moholy-Nagy became the Art Director of the magazine, dictated the total format of International Textiles and brought to bear his wide range of elementary graphic devices and their agile permutation to direct the reader's mind through forceful, clear, legible and fresh layouts. He relished the publisher's new typeface, an important feature in regulating the tri-lingual text. His constant questioning of the page space and sequence, supported by judicious, visual contrasts, demonstrated how his commercial graphics were extensions to, rather than imitations of, his paintings and typophotos, but were similarly aimed at public enlightenment. With this periodical, published twice a month and read in over thirty-five countries, Moholy achieved his widest dissemination of the new typography, though anonymously.

History
In 1933 the magazine International Textiles was set up in Amsterdam where it was published every two months. In the same year a London office was opened under the direction of Hans Juda. Initially the magazine included advertisements, editorial comment and illustrated fashion news on all aspects of international fashion and textiles. It also featured articles on the international economic situation and export markets, as well as reporting on exhibitions and trade fairs. The text was published in Dutch, English, French and German. At the outbreak of the Second World War communications were severed between the Dutch and English offices and the two journals continued publication independently during the War, both using the title International Textiles. With the end of the War this situation was formalised and from March 1946 the British magazine changed its title to The Ambassador, acting as the British export journal for textiles and fashion. The original magazine continued publication in the Netherlands under the title International Textiles.

In 1946 The Ambassador had offices in 45 countries worldwide. During the post-war period the magazine featured articles on developments in trade and industry, the introduction of new dyes, finishes and yarns, and the establishment of new organisations to promote fashion and textiles such as the Colour, Design and Style Centre in Manchester. It also included a regular monthly discussion on the present and future textile trade with features on dress, fashions, furnishing fabrics, carpets and household linen. The magazine closed in 1972.

Important Contributors
One of the most important contributors was Max Hoff, whose early art was published in the magazine in 1934.

References
 "Albers and Moholy-Nagy: from the Bauhaus to the new world" by Achim Borchardt-Hume
Textiles in the V&A Archives

1933 establishments in the Netherlands
1972 disestablishments in the Netherlands
Bi-monthly magazines published in the Netherlands
Defunct magazines published in the Netherlands
Business magazines published in the Netherlands
Magazines established in 1933
Magazines disestablished in 1972
Magazines published in Amsterdam
Professional and trade magazines
Textile industry